Marlboro Gardens is a suburb of Johannesburg, South Africa. It is located in Region E of the City of Johannesburg Metropolitan Municipality. Under apartheid, it was an Indian township associated with Sandton.

See also
Marlboro, Gauteng

References

Johannesburg Region E
Former Indian townships in South Africa